Gaétan Soucy (21 October 1958 – 9 July 2013) was a Canadian novelist and professor.

Life
Born in Montreal, Quebec, Soucy studied physics at Université de Montréal, completed a master's degree in philosophy, and studied Japanese language and literature at McGill University.

Soucy has written four novels. His first two, L'Immaculée conception (translated as The Immaculate Conception by Lazer Lederhendler) and L'Acquittement (translated as Atonement by Sheila Fischman) are extraordinary, dark and baroque works. His third novel, La petite fille qui aimait trop les allumettes (translated as The Little Girl Who Was Too Fond of Matches by Fischman) caused a sensation in Quebec and was immediately translated into more than ten languages. His fourth novel, Music-Hall!, was published in 2002, and translated as Vaudeville! by Fischman.

La petite fille qui aimait trop les allumettes was chosen for inclusion in the French version of Canada Reads, broadcast on Radio-Canada in 2004, where it was defended by actor, film director, screenwriter, and musician Micheline Lanctôt.

He died on 9 July 2013 in Montreal of a heart attack.

Awards and recognition
Nominated for the Prix Renaudot, for La petite fille qui aimait trop les allumettes
Prix Ringuet from the Académie des lettres du Québec, for La petite fille qui aimait trop les allumettes
Prix du grand public La Presse/Salon du livre de Montréal, for La petite fille qui aimait trop les allumettes
The Immaculate Conception, shortlisted for the 2006 Scotiabank Giller Prize

Bibliography
L'Immaculée conception (1994) (translated as The Immaculate Conception; published in France as 8 décembre)
L'Acquittement (1997) (translated as Atonement)
La petite fille qui aimait trop les allumettes (1998) (translated as The Little Girl Who Was Too Fond of Matches)
 Music-Hall!, (2002) (translated as Vaudeville!)

References

External links
 Soucy, Gaétan at The Canadian Encyclopedia
 Critical bibliography database (Auteurs.contemporain.info)  

1958 births
2013 deaths
Canadian male novelists
Writers from Montreal
Université de Montréal alumni
McGill University alumni
Canadian novelists in French
20th-century Canadian novelists
20th-century Canadian male writers